Lambert v Co-operative Insurance Society Ltd [1975] 2 Lloyd’s Rep 485 is an English contract law case concerning misrepresentation. It is an example of the operation of a positive duty of good faith in contracts for insurance.

Facts
Mrs Lambert signed a proposal form for ‘All Risks’ insurance over her husband’s jewelry, without mentioning her husband was convicted previously of receiving 1730 stolen cigarettes and was fined £25. The Co-op issued the policy. Mr Lambert was convicted of two more dishonesty offences in 1971 and sentenced to 15 months jail. Mrs Lambert did not reveal this either when the policy was renewed in 1972. In April 1972 some items worth £311 were lost or stolen and the Co-op refused on the basis of a failure to disclose.

Judgment
Mackenna J held ‘the assured is under a duty of disclosure… [but the] extent of the duty is the matter in controversy.’ You could have a duty to disclose everything you think is material, everything a reasonable person thinks is, everything the particular insurer thinks is, or everything a reasonable or prudent insurer thinks is, like in s 18 Marine Insurance Act 1906. Because there is no difference between this insurance and marine insurance in principle, it should be the latter. He did however say the law was unsatisfactory and the Co-op were doing ‘a heartless thing… but that is their business, not mine.’

See also

English contract law
Misrepresentation in English law

Notes

English misrepresentation case law
High Court of Justice cases
1975 in case law
1975 in British law